The AEV Prospector is an American pickup truck made by American Expedition Vehicles and based on the Ram Pickup.

References

Pickup trucks